Gryaznukha is a rural locality (a village) in Dobryansky District, Perm Krai, Russia. The population was 16 as of 2010.

Geography 
Gryaznukha is located 59 km northeast of Dobryanka (the district's administrative centre) by road. Omelichi is the nearest rural locality.

References 

Rural localities in Dobryansky District